Asianopis is a genus of Asian net-casting spiders first described by Y. J. Lin, L. Shao and A. Hänggi in 2020.

Species
 it contains thirty-three species:

Asianopis anchietae (Brito Capello, 1867) – West Africa, Angola, South Africa
Asianopis aruensis (Roewer, 1938) – Indonesia (Aru Is.)
Asianopis aspectans (Pocock, 1900) – Cameroon, Equatorial Guinea, DR Congo, South Africa
Asianopis aurita (F. O. Pickard-Cambridge, 1902) – Mexico
Asianopis camela (Thorell, 1881) – New Guinea
Asianopis celebensis (Merian, 1911) – Indonesia (Sulawesi)
Asianopis cornigera (Gerstaecker, 1873) – Ethiopia, Rwanda, Burundi, Tanzania, South Africa
Asianopis cylindrica (Pocock, 1898) – Mozambique, South Africa
Asianopis dumogae (Merian, 1911) – Indonesia (Sulawesi)
Asianopis fasciata (L. Koch, 1879) – Australia (Queensland)
Asianopis fasciculigera (Simon, 1909) – Vietnam
Asianopis giltayi (Lessert, 1930) – Congo
Asianopis goalparaensis (Tikader & Malhotra, 1978) – India, Nepal
Asianopis guineensis (Berland & Millot, 1940) – Guinea
Asianopis kollari (Doleschall, 1859) – Myanmar, Indonesia (Ambon)
Asianopis konplong (Logunov, 2018) – Vietnam
Asianopis labangan (Barrion-Dupo & Barrion, 2018) – Philippines
Asianopis liukuensis (Yin, Griswold & Yan, 2002) – India, China
Asianopis longipalpula (Strand, 1913) – Central Africa
Asianopis luzonensis (Barrion-Dupo & Barrion, 2018) – Philippines
Asianopis madagascariensis (Lenz, 1886) – Madagascar
Asianopis mediocris (Kulczyński, 1908) – New Guinea
Asianopis ornata (Pocock, 1902) – Ethiopia
Asianopis ravida (L. Koch, 1878) – Australia (Queensland)
Asianopis reticulata (Rainbow, 1899) – New Guinea
Asianopis schomburgki (Karsch, 1878) – Australia (South Australia)
Asianopis schoutedeni (Giltay, 1929) – Congo
Asianopis subrufa (L. Koch, 1878) – Australia (Queensland, New South Wales, Tasmania), New Zealand
Asianopis tabida (L. Koch, 1879) – Australia (Queensland)
Asianopis unicolor (L. Koch, 1878) – Australia (Western Australia)
Asianopis wangi Lin & Li, 2020 – China (Hainan)
Asianopis wuchaoi Lin & Li, 2020 – China
Asianopis zhuanghaoyuni Lin & Li, 2020 – China

See also
 Deinopis
 List of Deinopidae species

References

Further reading

Deinopidae
Araneomorphae genera
Spiders of Asia